Frederick Frelinghuysen (April 13, 1753April 13, 1804) was an American lawyer, soldier, and senator from New Jersey. A graduate of the College of New Jersey (now Princeton University), Frederick went on to become an officer during the American Revolutionary War. In addition, he served as a delegate to the Continental Congress. He was a United States Senator from New Jersey from 1793 until 1796, and served as the United States Attorney for the District of New Jersey in 1801.

Early life
He was born near Somerville in the Province of New Jersey to John Frelinghuysen (1727–1754) of Flatbush, Brooklyn and Dinah Van Berg (1725–1807) of Amsterdam. His father, John, was the son of the immigrant minister Theodorus Jacobus Frelinghuysen, the progenitor of the Frelinghuysen family in New Jersey.

He graduated from the College of New Jersey (now Princeton University) in 1770, and was the sole instructor at Queen's College, New Brunswick (now Rutgers University) from 1771 to 1774. He studied law and was admitted to the bar in 1774, practicing law in Somerset County, New Jersey.

Military and political career
With the coming of the American Revolution, he became a member of the provincial congress of New Jersey from 1775 to 1776. In the War of Independence he served in the New Jersey militia as an artillery captain, seeing action at Trenton and Monmouth. In 1779 he served as a delegate to the Second Continental Congress. He served as a clerk to the Court of Common Pleas of Somerset County, New Jersey from 1781 to 1789. He also served in the New Jersey General Assembly in 1784 and again from 1800 to 1804.

He was a member of the New Jersey convention that ratified the United States Constitution in 1787. He was a member of the New Jersey Legislative Council (now the New Jersey Senate) representing Somerset County from 1790 to 1792.

President George Washington appointed him as brigadier general in the United States Army for the 1790 campaign against the western Indians. Frelinghuysen was elected to the United States Senate and served from March 4, 1793 to November 12, 1796, when he resigned. He was commissioned major general in the New Jersey militia in 1794, during the Whiskey Rebellion.

Personal life
He married Gertrude Schenck (1753–1794), the daughter of Helena Magdalena Van Liew and Hendrick (Henry) Joahnnes Schenck. Together, they had five children:

 General John Frelinghuysen (1776–1833)
 Maria Frelinghuysen (1778–1832)
 Theodore Frelinghuysen (1787–1862), a lawyer and New Jersey politician
 Frederick Frelinghuysen (1788–1820)
Catharine Frelinghuysen (1790-1865)

After his first wife Gertrude's death in 1794, Frederick Sr. married Ann Yard (1764–1839).

Frelinghuysen died in Millstone, New Jersey on April 13, 1804, his 51st birthday, and was buried at the Weston Burying Ground on the border of Manville, New Jersey and Bound Brook, New Jersey. His tombstone reads as follows:

Descendants
Among his other descendants are Frederick Theodore Frelinghuysen (1817–1885), U.S. Senator and Secretary of State; Joseph Sherman Frelinghuysen (1869–1948) US Senator from New Jersey; Peter Frelinghuysen, Jr. (1916–2011) New Jersey Congressman; and Rodney Frelinghuysen (born 1946) New Jersey Congressman.

References

External links

1753 births
1804 deaths
Politicians from Somerville, New Jersey
People of colonial New Jersey
Frelinghuysen family
American people of Dutch descent
Continental Congressmen from New Jersey
Pro-Administration Party United States senators from New Jersey
Federalist Party United States senators from New Jersey
New Jersey Federalists
Members of the New Jersey General Assembly
Members of the New Jersey Legislative Council
United States Attorneys for the District of New Jersey
Rutgers University faculty
Princeton University alumni
Continental Army officers from New Jersey
New Jersey militiamen in the American Revolution
American militia generals
Burials in New Jersey